MARCKS-like 1 is a protein in humans that is encoded by the Marcksl1 gene.

activation may induce vesicle transport in brain neurons [RGD, Feb 2006].

References

Further reading